North Carolina State University's College of Agriculture and Life Sciences (CALS) is the fourth largest college in the university and one of the largest colleges of its kind in the nation, with nearly 3,400 students pursuing associate, bachelor's, master's and doctoral degrees and 1,300 on-campus and 700 off-campus faculty and staff members.

With headquarters in Raleigh, North Carolina, the college includes 16 academic departments, the North Carolina Agricultural Research Service and the North Carolina Cooperative Extension Service. The college dean is Dr. Richard Linton.

The research service is the state's principal agency of agricultural and life sciences research, with close to 600 projects related to more than 70 agricultural commodities, related agribusinesses and life science industries. Scientists work not only on the college campus in Raleigh but also at 18 agricultural research stations and 10 field laboratories across the state.

The extension service is the largest outreach effort at North Carolina State University, with local centers serving all 100 of North Carolina's counties as well as the Eastern Band of the Cherokee Indians. Cooperative Extension's educational programs, carried out by state specialists and county agents, focus on agriculture, food and 4-H youth development. About 43,000 volunteers and advisory leaders also contribute to Extension's efforts.

The college staffs the Plants for Human Health Institute at the N.C. Research Campus in Kannapolis with faculty from the departments of horticultural science; food, bioprocessing and nutrition sciences; plant biology; genetics; and agricultural and resource economics.

The college's Department of Plant Pathology helps sponsor the Bailey Memorial Tour each year. This tour is offered to prospective agriculture students and gives them a broad based taste of the work of agricultural pathology, and is named after Dr. Jack Bailey, late pioneering Professor of Plant Pathology.

Departments 
The college has the following departments:
 Agricultural and Human Sciences
 Agricultural and Resource Economics
 Animal Science
 Applied Ecology
 Biological and Agricultural Engineering
 Crop and Soil Sciences
 Entomology and Plant Pathology
 Food, Bioprocessing and Nutrition Sciences
 Horticultural Science
 Molecular and Structural Biochemistry
 Plant and Microbial Biology
 Prestage Department of Poultry Science

Majors 
CALS offers more than 60 bachelor's, master's, Ph.D. and associate degree programs in a wide array of disciplines. Undergraduate majors are as follows:

 Agricultural Business Management
 Biological Sciences Concentration
Agricultural Education
Teacher Certification Option  
 Agricultural and Environmental Technology
 Agricultural Systems Management
 Environmental Systems Management
 Agricultural Science
 Animal Science
 Biochemistry
 Biological Engineering
 Agricultural Engineering Concentration
 Environmental Engineering Concentration
 Bioprocessing Engineering Concentration
 Bioprocessing Science
 Extension Education
 Agricultural Extension Concentration
 Youth Leadership Development Concentration
 Food Science
 Horticultural Science
 Floriculture, Ornamental, Fruits and Vegetables Concentration
 General Horticulture Concentration
 Landscape Design Concentration
 Natural Resources
 Soil and Water Systems Concentration
 Soil Resources Concentration
 Nutrition Science
Applied Nutrition Concentration
 Plant Biology
 Plant and Soil Science 
 Agroecology Concentration
 Agronomic Business Concentration
 Agronomic Science Concentration
 Crop Biotechnology Concentration
 Crop Production Concentration
 Soil Science Concentration
 Poultry Science
Soil and Land Development
Land Development Concentration
Soil Science Concentration
 Turfgrass Science

External links 
 North Carolina State University College of Agriculture and Life Sciences website
 Guide to the North Carolina State University, Department of Plant Pathology Reprint Collection 1876-1973

Notes 

North Carolina State University
Life sciences industry